Most surnames, including the Dieppa (variations of the surname Djepp-Djeep-Depp-Dieppe-Dieppo-Dieppa-Diepa-Yepa-Iepa) surname, came from patronymics (according to the baptismal, person's title, worldly name of one of the ancestors, including to the type of activity, place of origin, or some other characteristic of the ancestor). They started using their father's names these names came from many places including a dynasty's name and a person's occupation.

The Normans were a population arising in the medieval Duchy of Normandy from the intermingling between Norse Viking settlers and indigenous West Franks and Gallo-Romans. The term is also used to denote emigrants from the duchy who conquered other territories such as England and Sicily. The Norse settlements in West Francia (France) followed a series of raids on the French northern coast mainly from Denmark, although some also sailed from Norway and Sweden. Said settlements were finally legitimized when Rollo, a Scandinavian Viking leader, agreed to swear fealty to King Charles III of West Francia following the siege of Chartres in 911 AD. The intermingling in Normandy produced an ethnic and cultural "Norman" identity in the first half of the 10th century, an identity that continued to evolve over the centuries. 

Dieppa is a Norman dynasty (Norse-Venetians-French) surname whom scholars point out to their modern origin in Normandy (Northman seafarer’s people) comprises mainland Normandy (a part of France) and the Channel Islands (mostly the British Crown Dependencies), the Northman seafarer’s people. One source points out the Norse seafarer’s people (Vikings warriors) from southern Scandinavia (in present-day Denmark, Norway, and Sweden). In different social strata, surnames appeared at different times. The history of the Dieppa (Djepp) family dates back several hundred years. and merchants began to spread in the country. At first, only the wealthiest – “eminent merchants” – had the honor of receiving the Dieppa surname. At this time, numerous Boyar's and Knjaz (both translated as "Prince") were Royal-Ancient Nobility, Titled, Hereditary, Personal, or Stateless equal title-holders granted and recognized by the Imperial court of Rus (Ancient nobility in Russia, equivalent aristocracy next in rank to a Prince), and Noble families began to call themselves. It was during this period of time that the names of noble families appeared. The Dieppa surname was inherited from generation to generation by male (or female) line.

It is known that they travel from France to abroad around the globe.  Its inhabitants are a mixture of Vikings and Venetians who, settled and mix with the people of Normandy in this river mouth and with England in front, controlled and made expeditions reaching Brazil even before the Spanish and Portuguese. The (Djepp) ancestors founded the most distinguished port of Dieppe city. Dieppe, on the Alabaster Coast, in Pays de Caux, is a place that was appreciated by the Vikings because of its location by the Arques River and its deep harbor called "djeep". With the surname Dieppe and its derivations, there is a town in Germany called Dieppe and there were also Templar orders in relation to the surname. The sailors of Dieppe were known practically all over the world and were the first to arrive in Brazil I could also add that their ivory figures, medieval cartography, and glass are famous, since together with Murano, Venice they were highly appreciated by the Aristocracy who they were part. Another fact about the site (Dieppe) I will say is that it was the first Normandy landing invasion, in which the (nazi) Germans in World War II in 1944 massacred practically all the allies in the great majority of Canadians from there that in Canada there is also a town with that same toponym. Now there are many surnames similar to the one mentioned and some have the same origin but others do not; Dieppa in Germany is a last name of lineage, Dieppenbrock until now is unknown to me and Dieppenmbeck there is a Flemish painter with that last name and very good by the way in America, there are many people with this last name, some from Gran Canaria starting point for many emigrants traveling to the new world.

Normandy (French: Normandie); from Old French Normanz, originally from the word for "Northman" in several Scandinavian languages) is a geographical and cultural region in Northwestern Europe, roughly coextensive with the historical Duchy of Normandy. The inhabitants of Normandy are known as Normans, and the region is the historic homeland of the Norman language. Large settlements include Rouen, Le Havre, and Cherbourg. Normandy's name comes from the settlement of the territory by Vikings ("Northmen") starting in the 9th century and confirmed by a treaty in the 10th century between King Charles III of France and the Viking Jarl Rollo, Count of Rouen. Rollo was born in the mid-9th century; his place of birth is almost definitely located in the region of Scandinavia, although it is uncertain whether he is Danish or Norwegian. This disparity may result from the indifferent and interchangeable usage in Europe, at the time, of terms such as "Vikings", "Northmen", "Swedes", "Danes", "Norwegians" and so on (in the Medieval Latin texts Dani vel Nortmanni means 'Danes or Northmen'). The name Rollo is first recorded as the leader of these Viking settlers in a charter of 918, and he continued to reign over the region of Normandy until at least 928. He was succeeded by his son William Longsword in the Duchy of Normandy that he had founded. The offspring of Rollo and his followers, through their intermingling with the indigenous Frankish and Gallo-Roman population of the lands they settled, became known as the "Normans". After the Norman conquest of England and their conquest of southern Italy and Sicily over the following two centuries, their descendants came to rule England, much of Ireland, Sicily, and Antioch from the 11th to 13th centuries, leaving behind an enduring legacy in the history of Europe and the Near East. For almost 150 years following the Norman conquest of England in 1066, Normandy and England were linked by having the same person reign as both Duke of Normandy and King of England.

With spirits of conquest and seafaring, the Norman led many expeditions; among them to the Canary Islands; led by the French noblemen Jean De Bethencourt, and Gadifer De La Salle, arrived in Lanzarote, departing from La Rochelle, with a ship of 280 crew members, receiving the tutelage of the King of Castile, Enrique III. Bethencourt later returned to Europe, leaving his relative Maciot de Bethencourt as governor of the islands.

During the Norman feudal rule, the Conquest of the Canary Islands began in 1402 and ended in 1496, lasting almost a century. With Bethencourt came some of those (nobles) Andalusian and Basque partners who financed the conquest. Miscegenation (Norse-French-Spanish) occurred because there were very few women who came to accompany the soldiers and new lords.

Eugenio Egea Molina, considering the chronicles of Le Canarien, and on Pesquisas de Cábito fundamental, points out that from all the Norman surnames the one that stands out the most, "which over time were castellanized taking unique forms on the islands were “Betancor, Melián, Pícar, Marichal, Bristol, Diepa (members of the Norse-Venetians clan), Umpiérrez, Berriel, Samarin, Mason, Copan, Buillón, Perdomo, Ebarnies, and Bolancher”… These surnames will be simultaneously exported to the rest of the islands, and later, to America.

Other historian and genealogical sources also connected the surname with another very important port, the port of Ajaccio on the island of Corsica (today France) as both sides crossings paths to many entrepreneurs, and noble families to and from Italy. Corsica is an island in the Mediterranean Sea and one of the 18 regions of France. It is the fourth-largest island in the Mediterranean and lies southeast of the French mainland, west of the Italian Peninsula, and immediately north of the Italian island of Sardinia, which is the landmass nearest to it. A single chain of mountains makes up two-thirds of the island. In 2018, it had a population of 338,550. The island is a territorial collectivity of France. The regional capital is Ajaccio.

Notable people with the surname include:

 Roberto McCausland Dieppa (born 1959), Colombian pianist, composer, and conductor
 Nelson Dieppa (born 1971), Puerto Rican boxer
 Dom Bryan Dieppa y Vega I (born 1977), Puerto Rican Archbishop, Apostolic Nuncio, Chief of Name, and Arms of the Soberana Casa Real e Principesca Djepp y Vega 
 Diana Dieppa (born 1977), Colombian Fashion Designer, Fashionista, TV host, model
 Paulina Vega Dieppa (born 1993), Colombian TV host, model, and beauty queen
{ {felipe dieppa Colombamerican...actor and producer born 1989 new York.

{ ( Carlos Dieppa cuidadano colombovenzolano,,,industrial,mecena..ford representante..Barranquilla,col.